Doctor Who and the Silurians (also known simply as The Silurians) is the second serial of the seventh season in the British science fiction television series Doctor Who. It was first broadcast in seven weekly parts on BBC1 from 31 January to 14 March 1970.

The serial is set in an English moorland, the cave system below it, and London. In the serial, the alien time traveller the Third Doctor (Jon Pertwee) attempts to broker peace between humanity and the Silurians, an intelligent bipedal race of reptilians that ruled Earth before humans. This effort becomes undone by a xenophobic usurper Silurian, along with gung-ho human soldiers.

The story is the first appearance of the Silurians, for whom the Silurian hypothesis in science is named.

Plot

A nuclear powered cyclotron facility in some caves under a moorland is experiencing mysterious power drains and mental breakdowns amongst staff. The Third Doctor and Liz Shaw meet Brigadier Lethbridge-Stewart there to investigate. A worker who was potholing in the caves is found dead with giant claw marks on his body, and his companion has been traumatised. Lawrence, the Director, resents UNIT's presence and feels that it will interfere with the working of the plant. Major Baker, the security chief, believes there is a saboteur in the centre, and the Doctor discovers that the logs of the nuclear reactor's operation have been tampered with. When the Doctor makes his way into the caves, he is attacked by a dinosaur-like creature before it is called off by a strange whistling sound.

The Doctor analyses blood from a man-sized creature Major Baker shot at and finds similarities to "larger reptiles". The creature goes to the moorland on the surface and hides in a barn. Quinn goes into the caves to a hidden base, where he demands the knowledge he was promised. He is told that he must first help the wounded creature and is given a signal device, which emits the sound heard earlier.

The creature attacks a farmer and his wife when they discover it in the barn. The farmer dies of a heart attack after being frightened by it, but the wife survives and identifies her attacker. While investigating the barn, Liz is knocked unconscious by the creature, and it flees. The Brigadier and the Doctor follow the creature's tracks and find they end in tyre marks.

Breaking into Quinn's office, the Doctor finds a globe that depicts the Earth's continents as they were 200 million years ago along with notes about the Silurian period of Earth's history.

Quinn is discovered dead. The Doctor retrieves the signal device from his body and is surprised by the wounded Silurian creature. The Doctor tries to talk to the creature, but it runs away. Baker is captured and interrogated by the Silurians about the strength of humans. The Doctor and Liz follow Baker's route and open the entrance to the Silurian base with the signal device, where they find him in a locked cage. They witness a Silurian being revived from hibernation by a machine, explaining the energy drains that the reactor has been experiencing.

Masters, the Permanent Under-Secretary in charge of the centre, arrives. The Doctor tells them about the Silurians in the caves, urging peaceful contact. However, this is ignored when Quinn's assistant reveals that he was killed by the Silurian he held captive. The Doctor attempts to warn the Silurians, but they put him in a cage. The older Silurian tells the Doctor how their race retreated underground when they saw the Moon approaching Earth millions of years ago. The hibernation mechanism malfunctioned, and they did not revive until a new power source was discovered. A young Silurian orders Baker infected with bacteria before he is released. The older Silurian releases the Doctor, giving him a canister of the bacteria so he can discover a cure. The younger Silurian usurps and kills the older one for this act, becoming the new leader. The Doctor reaches the centre and warns everyone to stay away from Baker, who collapses with the infection. Masters decides to return to London, unaware that he has been infected. Baker is taken to a local hospital and dies.

The Doctor begins work on a cure. Masters has reached London and eludes the search parties looking for him. The bacteria spreads, and deaths begin. The Doctor finds a cure, but the Silurians attack the centre and abduct him. Liz discovers the formula for the cure, which is soon mass-produced and distributed. The Silurians intend to force the Doctor to use the reactor to provide power to a weapon to destroy the Van Allen Belt and make the Earth's environment hostile to humankind.

The Doctor overloads the reactor and tells the younger Silurian that the area will be irradiated for at least 25 years. The Silurians re-enter the caves to hibernate until the danger has passed. Since the mechanism is faulty, the younger Silurian will stay awake to operate it and sacrifice his life. The Doctor and Liz repair the reactor. The younger Silurian realises he has been duped into sending his race back to sleep. He attacks the Doctor but is shot by the Brigadier.

Later, the Doctor tells Liz that he proposes to revive the Silurians and try to reach a peaceful compromise between them and humanity. However, the Brigadier has other orders, and the Silurian base is blown up. The Doctor is horrified at this act of genocide, but Liz suggests that the Brigadier was acting on orders of his superiors.

Production
After the previous story, producers Derrick Sherwin and Peter Bryant (who was originally to have the producer's credit on this story) were transferred to the television series Paul Temple, and the BBC intended for Barry Letts to become producer. However, Letts was committed to another production, and could not be released until after the location work on Silurians was completed. Script editor Terrance Dicks and his assistant Trevor Ray shared the production responsibilities for the location work.

The incidental music for the serial was composed by Carey Blyton, who would also contribute music for Death to the Daleks (1974) and Revenge of the Cybermen (1975).

This story is the first to be recorded using colour studio cameras. The previous serial, Spearhead from Space, was the first in colour, but was shot entirely on location (i.e., outside the electronic TV studio), and on film (as opposed to videotape, the standard method for recording Doctor Who). Due to the move to colour, the production team made use of a technique known as Colour Separation Overlay (CSO, or Chroma key), which allowed images to be superimposed over each other using colour separation. This was used extensively in the series for many years, beginning with this serial.

Location filming took place at Marylebone station in London on 12 November 1969, but after the prints were damaged, the scenes were reshot on 24 November after the rest of the serial had been finished. Other location work was undertaken in Surrey, with the heathland scenes filmed at Hankley Common.

Alternative titles

This was the only time the name "Doctor Who" was used in the title of a serial on-screen (although Episode 5 of The Chase was titled "The Death of Doctor Who" on-screen and at the end of The Gunfighters, the caption read "Next Week Doctor Who and the Savages"). Although it was common in production paperwork to prefix "Doctor Who and..." to the story title at the time, the prefix was usually dropped when the director ordered the titles from the captioning department for transmission. However, this was not done for this particular story.

The reasons why this happened are not entirely clear. Director Timothy Combe states that he was presented with a story called Doctor Who and the Silurians and that it was always intended that the serial go out with that name. However, as Doctor Who historian Andrew Pixley points out, this was Combe's first serial as a full director and there was effectively no producer at this time, as noted above. In addition, the rehearsal scripts for the serial simply have The Silurians as the title. Pixley theorises that Combe was unaware of the standard production practice and gave the order to the captioning department for the "proper" title, as he believed it to be at the time.

Whatever the case, production paperwork from this point on stopped the practice of adding the prefix, perhaps as a measure to prevent the "mistake" from happening again.

Cast notes
Actor Paul Darrow would return to the series playing Tekker in Timelash (1985); he also appeared in the audio play The Next Life.

Geoffrey Palmer, who played Masters, also appears in The Mutants (1972) and in "Voyage of the Damned" (2007).

Peter Miles later played Professor Whitaker in Invasion of the Dinosaurs (1974) and Nyder in Genesis of the Daleks (1975). He also played Tragan in the radio drama The Paradise of Death and Gantman in the audio play Whispers of Terror.

Norman Jones had previously appeared as Khrisong in The Abominable Snowmen (1967) and would later play Hieronymous in The Masque of Mandragora (1976).

Ian Talbot, who played Travis in Episode Four, would later return as Klout in The Leisure Hive (1980).

Richard Steele, who plays Sergeant Hart, previously appeared as Commandant Gorton in Episode 2 of The War Games and would later appear as a guard in The Mark of the Rani

Broadcast and reception

The restored episodes were repeated on BBC2 on Tuesday evenings from 7 December 1999 to 25 January 2000, with a two-week gap between episodes three and four. Episode six was shifted to Thursday 20 January.

Mark Braxton of Radio Times wrote that the story had "quality in spades", especially in the location filming, and that the story was "gritty" and "provocative" with "fine character actors". He praised the design and the voice-acting of the Silurians but felt their rubber costume on-screen made them come across as "silly". Braxton was also disappointed with other production "shortcomings", such as the "cheap-looking" cave set, the dinosaur, and "Carey Blyton's electro-bagpiped Silurian theme". The A.V. Club reviewer Christopher Bahn wrote that it "keeps a snappy pace throughout thanks to Malcolm Hulke's well-plotted script". He noted that both the monsters and the humans were more complex than previously seen on Doctor Who. Like Braxton, he also felt the serial was "badly served by the Silurian costumes, which are terrible even by the standards of low-budget, 1970s TV". DVD Talk's John Sinnott noted that some parts were "a bit slow" due to the length, but it was a "mature" story where Pertwee defined his Doctor. However, Sinnott felt that John was still trying to find her character's place, and did not have much chemistry with Pertwee. Den of Geek gave a positive review of the serial, writing that "the production is only marred by its excessive number of episodes compared to the story it had to tell ... and an often-appalling 'medieval' score by experimentalist Carey Blyton". In 2010, Charlie Jane Anders of io9 listed Episode Six's cliffhanger as one of the best in all of Doctor Who. Anders listed the serial as a good example of the early Pertwee years, calling it "pretty fantastic" with enemies who "aren't just one-dimensional baddies" and the length "somewhat justified by a harrowing subplot where a plague starts killing people all across London".

Commercial releases

In print

A novelisation of this serial, written by Malcolm Hulke, was published by Target Books in January 1974 under the title Doctor Who and the Cave Monsters. In this adaptation, the Silurians were given names like Morka, Okdel and K'to. The novelisation gives extensive background to the reptile culture, including a prologue featuring their hibernation beginning. Large parts of the novelisation are told from the reptiles' point of view and there is an extensive back-story given to several characters including Quinn and Major Baker (called Barker in the novelisation). The novelisation avoids referring to the reptiles as Silurians (the word turns up as a UNIT password) but identifies the dinosaur in the caves as a tyrannosaurus rex. The novelisation was also translated into Dutch, Finnish, Japanese and Portuguese. An unabridged reading of the novelisation by actress Caroline John was released on CD in September 2007 by BBC Audiobooks.

Home media
The original 625-line PAL videotapes of the serial were wiped by the BBC for reuse, although they retained 16 mm b/w film recordings. In 1993, the colour signal from a 525-line NTSC version of all seven episodes (except for part of the beginning of episode 4) was used, along with colourisation techniques, to colourise the film prints for the VHS release, which was in July that year. In October 2006, the story's original soundtrack was released on CD as part of the 'Monsters on Earth' tin set, again alongside The Sea Devils and Warriors of the Deep, with linking narration from Caroline John. The CD was then individually re-issued in January 2008.

On 14 January 2008, a fresh restoration of the story was released on DVD as part of the boxed set called "Beneath the Surface", also including The Sea Devils and Warriors of the Deep (the black-and-white prints and off-air colour recordings were combined, with the colour prints distorted to reduce fringing and both prints processed with VidFIRE to restore video sections to 50 unique fields per second, rather than 25 frames per second, with no motion information between the two fields corresponding to each frame). The story was then released on DVD again in 2013, included in a set paired with The Hungry Earth and Cold Blood (a two-part Eleventh Doctor story from 2010), in 'The Monster Collection' series, specifically The Silurians entry.

References

External links

Doctor Who Locations – The Silurians

Reviews
Doctor Who and the Silurians reviews at Outpost Gallifrey

Target novelisation

On Target — Doctor Who and the Cave-Monsters

Third Doctor serials
1970 British television episodes
Doctor Who serials novelised by Malcolm Hulke
Television episodes about dinosaurs